Miss World Ecuador 2013, was the 1st edition of the Miss World Ecuador held on July 4, 2013, after Miss Ecuador Organization lost the rights to send a delegate to Miss World. At the end of the night Laritza Párraga from Santo Domingo was crowned Miss World Ecuador 2013 and will compete in Miss World 2013 next September in Bali, Indonesia.

Results

Placements

International representation

Special awards

Judges
 Pierina Correa
 Carlos Coello
 Isabel Novoa
 Raúl Del Sol
 Soledad Diab – Miss Ecuador 1992
 Aníbal Marrero
 Susana Rivadeneira – Miss Ecuador 2004
 Álvaro Fernández
 Juliette Villa
 Rolando Panchana

Official contestants

Debuts

 Bolívar
 Cañar
  El Oro
  Esmeraldas
 Guayas
 Imbabura
 Los Ríos
  Manabí
  Pichincha
 Santo Domingo
 Tungurahua

Did Not Compete

  Pichincha - Andrea Estefanía Realpe Pérez

Crossovers

 Karen Ramírez won the title of Reina de Machala 2012, Reina de El Oro 2012, Reina Nacional de la Minería 2012 and Reina del Pacífico 2012.
 Ariana Vilela competed in Reina de Esmeraldas 2012 but she was unplaced.
 Carolina Wray competed in Reina de Guayaquil 2012 and was 1st Runner-up .
 Nirvana Torres won the title of Reina de Babahoyo 2011, Reina de Los Ríos 2011, and Miss Queen World 2011.
 Laritza Párraga won the title of Reina de Santo Domingo 2012, Virreina Nacional del Pacífico 2012, and earlier in 2013 she withdrew from the pageant Miss Ecuador 2013.
 Angela Bonilla participated in Miss Earth 2015
 Angela Bonilla won Miss Global 2016
 Katherine Espin won Miss Earth 2016

References

Beauty pageants in Ecuador
2013